Jesse Edwards may refer to:

 Jesse Edwards (artist) (born 1977), American fine art oil painter, graffiti artist, and ceramicist
 Jesse Edwards (baseball), Negro league baseball player
 Jesse Edwards (basketball) (born 2000), Dutch basketball player
 Jesse Edwards (businessman) (1849–1924), businessman and founder of Newberg, Oregon